Johanna ("Janneke") Dorotheo Maria Schopman (born 26 April 1977) is the head coach of the Indian women's national field hockey team and a former Dutch field hockey player who played as a defender for Dutch club HC Den Bosch and the Netherlands national team.

Playing career 
Schopman started playing hockey at Dutch club Tempo '34 in Rotterdam. She also played for HC Rotterdam, before transferring to HC Den Bosch, where she played until stopping in 2010. While part of the Den Bosch squad, she won 6 national titles.

Schopman was first selected for the Dutch national squad in 2001. Schopman was a member of the Dutch squad that won the silver medal at the 2004 Summer Olympics in Athens, after losing to Germany in the final . She scored one of the penalties in the semi-finals against Argentina in the semi-finals. She was also part of the Dutch squad that became World Champion at the 2006 Women's Hockey World Cup in Madrid and which won the 2007 Champions Trophy. She was part of the 2007 squad that was featured in the documentary 'Goud' by Niek Koppen, about their preparation for the 2007 Women's EuroHockey Nations Championship. At the 2008 Summer Olympics in Beijing she won an Olympic gold medal with the Dutch national team beating China in the final 2–0. She was the captain of the Dutch national squad during the 2010 World Cup in Rosario, where they won the silver medal after losing to Argentina 1–3 in the final.

Coaching career 
After ending her career as a professional hockey player in 2010, Schopman became the head coach for the women's squad of the Dutch club SCHC. In 2014, she led the team to their first appearance in the final of the Hoofdklasse, the top league in the Netherlands. In 2014, Schopman was assigned to be the head coach for the U21 US Women's National Team and assistant coach for the United States women's national team under Craig Parnham. In January 2017 she became the US Women's National Team head coach. With Schopman as head coach, the team came 3rd in the 2017 Pan American Cup in Lancaster, United States, and 14th in the 2018 World Cup in London, United Kingdom.

Indian hockey women’s team made her their analytical coach in January 2020. After the Tokyo Olympics, Sjoerd Marijne, the previous head coach of the team, declined a contract extension, and Schopman became the head coach.

References

External links

1977 births
Living people
Dutch female field hockey players
Field hockey players at the 2004 Summer Olympics
Field hockey players at the 2008 Summer Olympics
Medalists at the 2008 Summer Olympics
Olympic field hockey players of the Netherlands
Olympic gold medalists for the Netherlands
Olympic medalists in field hockey
Olympic silver medalists for the Netherlands
Sportspeople from Haarlem
Medalists at the 2004 Summer Olympics
Dutch expatriate sportspeople in the United States
LGBT field hockey players
HC Rotterdam players
HC Den Bosch players
21st-century Dutch women